Dharmashala is a small town and headquarters of the Anthoor Municipality in Kannur district of the North Malabar region in the Indian state of Kerala. It is located near National Highway 66 between Kannur and Taliparamba. Dharmashala is an important educational and industrial hub in the Kannur district and also an important tourism destination of Malabar region. Dharmashala is a major government officials settlement area in Kannur. A large number of migrant labourers from various other states are working in the industrial development area in Dharmashala. Students from various parts of country study at institutes such as NIFT. Nearby important institutions and attractions are the Kerala Armed Police (KAP) 4th Battalion Mangattuparamba, Government College of Engineering Kannur, Kannur University, KELTRON, Vismaya water theme park, Parassinikkadavu Shree Muthappan temple, Doordarshan kendra, Parassinikkadavu Snake Park, Industrial Development Plot, Central School, EK Nayanar memorial women and child hospital, Si-met college of nursing, M.V.R memorial Ayurveda Medical College, Institute of Co-operative Management (ICM), National Institute of Fashion Technology, Vellikkeel eco tourism park, Hi-Five sports indoor stadium, Kerala Clays and Ceramics Ltd. etc.

Etymology 
Long ago, the present Dharmashala town area was a deserted place known as Mangattu Parambu. At that time there was a shelter for passengers and pilgrims for taking rest and refreshing while travelling long distance on foot. From there the pilgrims and other passers by were served with sambharam, a term for spiced butter milk in Malayalam language. The sambharam was given as dharmam, free of cost. So the shelter (shala in Malayalam language) from where this was given was called as Dharma Shala, then Dharmashala. This facility to passers-by was arranged by the Parassinikadavu Sree Muthappan temple authorities and can still be seen as a small building about 100 m south of the present Dharmashala junction near the national highway.

Places of interest 
 Vismaya Water Theme Park
The Vismaya Water Theme Park is located at Parassinikadavu near Taliparamba.

 Parassinkkadavu Snake Park

The park houses a variety of snakes and other small animals, including the spectacled cobra, king cobra, Russell's viper, krait and various pit vipers. There is also a large collection of non-venomous snakes including pythons. The park is dedicated to the preservation and conservation of snakes, many species of which are gradually becoming extinct. In a live show, trained personnel play and 'interact' with a variety of snakes, including cobras and vipers, and try to quell mythical fears and superstitions about snakes.  It has also been proposed that a laboratory to extract venom from snakes for purposes of research be set up here.

The Snake Park, set up by the Visha Chikilsa Kendra, is regularly visited by both foreign and domestic tourists. The Kendra also offers effective treatment for snake bites.
 Mullool 
Mullool is a small village near Dharmasala. Three sides of Mullool are surrounded by small hills and one side is the Mullool river. In Mullool there is the Mullool L.P. School, a public library and many Hindu temples such as Sri Kannikorumakan Kshethram, Sri Puthiya Bhagavathi Kshethram, Thayiparadevatha Kshethram, Shastham Koota, Ayyappa Temple, Parakali Amma etc.

 Pattinithara 
This is a famous village spot in Dharmasala.From here you will get a good view of Bakkalam Vayal/Paddy field.The views are good during the monsoon as paddy cultivation occurs during this time.its a rainfed cultivation and during winter season vegetables are cultivated.

Hospital 

 EK NAYANAR MEMORIAL Govt. Hospital for Mother & Children (അമ്മയും കുഞ്ഞും )  This Hospital is mainly for Woman and children. 
 MVR Ayurveda Hospital  It is located near the Snake Park in Dharmasala

Education 

 One of the best school in the district Kendriya Vidyalaya is  located near Keltron Nagar.
 Kannur University was established by Act 22 of 1996 of the Kerala Legislative Assembly. The university by the name "Malabar University" had come into existence even earlier by the promulgation of an ordinance by the Governor of Kerala, on 9 November 1995. The university was inaugurated on 2 March 1996 by the Chief Minister of Kerala. The objective of the Kannur University Act 1996 was to establish in the state of Kerala a teaching, residential and affiliating university so as to provide for the development of higher education in Kasargod and Kannur revenue districts and the Mananthavady Taluk of Wayanad district. Kannur University is a multi-campus university.
Government College of Engineering, Kannur was established in 1986 near Dharmashala, as a center for imparting engineering education in northern Kerala.
Today the college is among the top ten engineering colleges of the state, providing higher studies in the field of technical education.

 The thirteenth National Institute of Fashion Technology (NIFT) Campus in Kannur is located in Dharmashala.
 A B.Ed College located at Dharmashala near Keltron Nagar is one of the major school in Kannur.

Villages in Dharmashala area 

 Anthoor
 Aroli
 Kalliasseri
 Morazha
 Punnakkulangara

Transportation 

Kannur International Airport is located at a distance of 35 km from Dharmasala.

This highway is scheduled to be expanded to four lanes soon.

Kannapuram Railway Station is nearest railway station.

Dharmasala is a tri junction with roads to Kannur in the South,Taliparamba in North and Parassini kadavu to the East. The people going to the Parassini kadavu temple will take a turn to East from here.

See also 

Anthoor
Parassinikkadavu
Morazha
Punnakkulangara
Mangattuparambu
Kalliasseri
Aroli

References